Olaf Solberg (10 February 1885 – 31 July 1968) was a Norwegian rower who competed for Christiania Roklub. He competed in coxed eight and in coxed four, inriggers at the 1912 Summer Olympics in Stockholm.

References

External links 
 

1885 births
1968 deaths
Sportspeople from Drammen
Norwegian male rowers
Rowers at the 1912 Summer Olympics
Olympic rowers of Norway